Burak Çelik (born 21 July 1992) is a Turkish actor and model.

Life and career 
His maternal family immigrated from Balkan, Ottoman Empire. His paternal family is from Ordu. His uncle is a footbal player. At the age of thirteen, Burak Çelik left football due to asthma. In 2013, Çelik competed in the Best Model of Turkey and Best Model of World beauty pageants and finished in the first place. 

Çelik started his acting career with the series Karagül, in which he portrayed the character of Serdar for 100 episodes. He then had a leading role in the Hayat Sevince Güzel TV series, playing the role of Barış. 

His action roles are in Kuruluş: Osman,  military series "Söz" which nominated International Emmy Awards and Ben Bu Cihana Sığmazam.

With Karagül's co-stars Sevda Erginci, Ece Uslu and Kuruluş Osman's co-star Seçkin Özdemir and Kara Yazı's co-star Emre Kınay, he played in Sevgili Geçmiş. With Ben Bu Cihana Sığmazam's co-star Pelin Akil, he played in comedy film "Deli Aşk". He played in "Senden Daha Güzel" alongside Cemre Baysel.

Filmography

Awards and nominations

References

External links 
 
 

|}

Living people
1992 births
Male actors from Istanbul
Turkish male models
Turkish male television actors